666 Ways to Love: Prologue is an EP by Finnish band HIM, released in 1996, only in Finland. It is produced by Hiili Hiilesmaa, and was recorded at Finnvox, MD and Peacemakers, Helsinki. It is their first release after a demo in 1995. Only 1,000 were produced. The woman pictured on the front cover of the album is the mother of HIM's lead singer, Ville Valo. The EP was re-released for the first time, on vinyl, on 25 November 2014 in Lashes to Ashes, Lust to Dust: A Vinyl Retrospective '96-'03.

Track listing 
All songs written by Ville Valo, except where noted.
 "Stigmata Diaboli" – 2:55
 "Wicked Game" (Chris Isaak) – 3:56
 "Dark Sekret Love" – 5:19
 "The Heartless" – 7:25

 The last 1:40 of "The Heartless" was put as the hidden track on HIM's debut, Greatest Lovesongs Vol. 666. "The Heartless" itself and "Wicked Game" were re-recorded for the album, the former of which was much shorter than its original form.

Personnel 
 Ville Hermanni Valo − lead vocals
 Mikko Viljami "Linde" Lindström − lead guitar
 Oskari "Oki" Kymäläinen − rhythm guitar
 Mikko Henrik Julius "Migé" Paananen − bass guitar
 Antto Melasniemi − keyboards
 Juhana Tuomas "Pätkä" Rantala − drums

Guest musicians 
 Sanna-June Hyde − vocals on "Dark Sekret Love"
 Kai "Hiili" Hiilesmaa − moog synthesizer on "Dark Sekret Love"

Notes

References 

1996 debut EPs
HIM (Finnish band) EPs